Cretomicrophorus is an extinct genus of flies in the family Dolichopodidae from the Upper Cretaceous of Russia, France and the United States. The generic name is a combination of the Latin word creta ("chalk") and the generic name Microphorus.

Species
The genus contains three species:
 †Cretomicrophorus novemundus Grimaldi & Cumming, 1999
 †Cretomicrophorus piolencensis Nel, Garrouste & Daugeron, 2017
 †Cretomicrophorus rohdendorfi Negrobov, 1978

References

†
†
Prehistoric Diptera genera
Late Cretaceous insects